Solnechnogorsky District is an administrative and municipal district (raion), one of the thirty-six in Moscow Oblast, Russia. It is located in the northwest of the oblast. Its administrative center is the town of Solnechnogorsk. Population: 128,580 (2010 Census);  The population of Solnechnogorsk accounts for 41.2% of the district's total population.

References

Notes

Sources

Districts of Moscow Oblast